Camp Raffalli is a military camp of the French Army. It is located in the municipalities of Calenzana and Calvi, Haute-Corse. It serves as a garrison and training ground for the 2nd Foreign Parachute Regiment (2ème REP) and the Calvi defense base support group.

Gallery

References

French Army
Foreign Legion
Barracks in France